Karolina Siódmiak (born 14 September 1981) is a Polish handball player. She plays for the club AZS OŚ Gdańsk, the Polish national team and represented Poland at the 2013 World Women's Handball Championship in Serbia.

References

External links
Player profile at the Polish Handball Association website 

Polish female handball players
1981 births
Living people
People from Giżycko County
Sportspeople from Warmian-Masurian Voivodeship
21st-century Polish women